John Auld may refer to:

John Auld (footballer) (1862–1932), Scottish footballer
John Auld (painter) (1914–1996), British painter
John Allan Auld (1853–1924), Canadian politician
Sir John Auld Mactaggart, 4th Baronet (born 1951), Scottish entrepreneur and philanthropist

See also
Auld (surname)
John Gray (nightwatchman) (died 1858), owner of Greyfriars Bobby
Johnny Ould (born 1940), British boxer